Troup Independent School District is a public school district based in Troup, Texas (USA).

The district is located in southeastern Smith County and extends into a small portion of northeastern Cherokee County.

Troup ISD has three schools:
Troup High School (Grades 9-12)
Troup Middle School (Grades 6-8)
Troup Elementary School (Grades PK-5)

In the early 90s Troup made it to 4 consecutive AA basketball State championships winning two in a row led by towering posts Gregg Austin and Jaime Kendrick.

In 2011, the school district was rated "recognized" by the Texas Education Agency.

References

External links
Troup ISD

School districts in Smith County, Texas
School districts in Cherokee County, Texas